Local elections in Ormoc City, Leyte were held on May 9, 2016 within the Philippine general election. The voters elected candidates for the elective local posts in the city: the mayor, vice mayor, and ten councilors.

Background
Incumbent city mayor Edward Codilla ran for re-election to his post; he ran against an opponent in the 2013 election race, actor and sportsman Richard Gomez. Codilla ran under the Liberal Party, while Gomez ran under the Nationalist People's Coalition.

Codilla defeated Gomez, in the 2013 elections with a slim margin of 2,248 votes.

Results
The candidates for mayor and vice mayor with the highest number of votes wins the seat; they are voted separately, therefore they may be of different parties when elected.

Mayoral Election
Parties are as stated in their certificate of candidacies. Edward Codilla is the incumbent.

Vice Mayoral Election
Parties are as stated in their certificate of candidacies. Leo Carmelo Locsin, Jr. is the incumbent. He switched parties for this election, from Liberal Party to Nationalist People's Coalition.

City Council Election
Voters elected ten councilors to comprise the City Council or the Sangguniang Panlungsod. Candidates are voted for separately so winning candidates may come from different political parties. The ten candidates with the highest number of votes win the seats. For the tickets, names that are italicized were incumbents seeking reelection.

Liberal Party/Codilla Ticket

Nationalist People's Coalition/Gomez Ticket

|-bgcolor=black
|colspan=5|

References

External links
 Official website of the Commission on Elections
  Official website of National Movement for Free Elections (NAMFREL)
 Official website of the Parish Pastoral Council for Responsible Voting (PPCRV)

2016 Philippine local elections
Elections in Leyte (province)
Ormoc